Green Zone may refer to:

 Green Zone, Baghdad, Iraq; a fortified high-security district in central Baghdad
 Various other areas with heightened security, in reference to the famous Baghdad area
 Green Zone, a musical trio founded in 2004 by Kato Hideki
 Green Zone (film), a 2010 war film by director Paul Greengrass starring Matt Damon about Baghdad in the U.S.-Iraq War
 The Green Zone: The Environmental Costs of US Militarism, a 2009 book by Barry Sanders (professor)
 Green Zone, a sports radio show originally called The Drew Remenda Sports Show with Drew Remenda
 Green Zone, a change in coloration on third and fourth downs on NBC Sunday Night Football starting in 2018
 Green Zone, a site security methodology employed by Network Rail's controller of site safety

See also

 
 
 Safe zone
 Green (disambiguation)
 Zone (disambiguation)